Sharon Walraven (born 19 June 1970, Schaesberg) is a Dutch wheelchair tennis player. She became paraplegic at age 23 after complications following a fall while she was ice-skating. She has won seven Grand Slams doubles titles partnering compatriot Esther Vergeer. At the 2008 Paralympics in Beijing she won the gold medal in the women's doubles competition. At the 2000 Paralympics in Sydney she won a silver medal in the women's singles competition. Walraven has a highest ranking of No.2 in singles and No.1 in doubles.

Walraven won the doubles title with Griffioen in St Louis 2010, however the pair lost in the final in Paris. With Graviller she took the Florida Open title.

With Vergeer, Walraven achieved the Grand Slam in 2011, defeating Griffioen and van Koot in all four finals. During the finals the pair recovered from being 5–2 down in the final set at Wimbledon and 6–1 down in the second set tiebreak at the US Open to win. The pair were also victorious in the Masters. Alongside Vergeer she lost the final at Boca Raton.

2012 saw Walraven win a singles title in Trofeo della Mole. However Walraven also lost finals in Sardinia, Olot and Gauteng. In doubles competition Walraven won the first Grand Slam of the year, the Australian Open with Vergeer. Throughout the rest of the year she won the Japan Open with Buis, and titles in Olot and Sardinia with Ellerbrock. Walraven was runner up at the Pensacola Open with Vergeer, in Atlanta with Sevenans, and made the finals in Gauteng and Johannesburg with Kruger. Walraven helped her nation win a 25th World Team Cup final.

Grand Slam titles
 Australian Open: singles 2005, doubles 2011, 2012
 French Open:  doubles 2011
 Wimbledon: doubles 2010, 2011
 US Open: doubles 2010, 2011

Grand Slam performance timelines

Wheelchair singles

Wheelchair doubles

References

External links
 
 
 Official website 

1970 births
Living people
Dutch female tennis players
Wheelchair tennis players
Paralympic wheelchair tennis players of the Netherlands
Paralympic gold medalists for the Netherlands
Paralympic silver medalists for the Netherlands
Paralympic medalists in wheelchair tennis
Medalists at the 2000 Summer Paralympics
Medalists at the 2008 Summer Paralympics
Wheelchair tennis players at the 2000 Summer Paralympics
Wheelchair tennis players at the 2008 Summer Paralympics
Australian Open (tennis) champions
French Open champions
US Open (tennis) champions
Wimbledon champions
People from Landgraaf
People with paraplegia
Sportspeople from Limburg (Netherlands)